DeepRoute.ai is a self-driving technology company headquartered in Shenzhen and Fremont, California and is focused on advancing urban logistics and popularizing robotaxis.

DeepRoute.ai has partnered with Caocao Mobility, Dongfeng Motors, and Dongfeng Commercial Vehicle to test self-driving vehicles. The company began self-driving robotaxi service in Wuhan in April 2021, and the company publicly launched robotaxi service in Shenzhen in July 2021.

In addition to robotaxi technology (DeepRoute-INJOY), DeepRoute.ai has also developed a self-driving solution for medium-duty trucks (DeepRoute-LINK). The company has received a Passenger Carry Permit from the California Public Utilities Commission.

Its L4 Full Stack Self-Driving System, DeepRoute-Sense, was named a CES 2020 Innovation Awards Honoree in the category of Vehicle Intelligence & Transportation. It includes a lightweight set-top box and sensor-fusion calibration service, consisting of GNSS, eight vehicle cameras, three lidars and a series of other sensors to help correspondence and data synchronization between the controllers. In December 2021, DeepRoute.ai announced DeepRoute-Driver 2.0, a production-ready Level 4 system comprising five solid-state lidar sensors, eight cameras, a proprietary computing system and an optional millimeter-wave radar. Driver 2.0 is equipped with two DRIVE Orin SoCs, each of which is capabable of achieving 254 trillion operations per second (TOPS). The solution also uses 5G remote control and network safety redundancy for safety measures.

DeepRoute.ai secured $50 million in a Series Pre-A led by Fosun RZ Capital, the venture capital arm of Chinese conglomerate Fosun International in September 2019. The company also raised a Series B funding round of $300 million in September 2021, which included Alibaba, Jeneration Capital, Yunqi Partners and Geely as investors. DeepRoute.ai’s CEO is Maxwell Zhou, who led autonomous driving projects at Baidu, Texas Instruments and DJI.

History

DeepRoute.ai was founded in Shenzhen in February 2019 by Maxwell Zhou who has a Doctorate degree in Artificial Intelligence.

In August of 2020, DeepRoute.ai partnered with CaoCao Mobility to start Robotaxi service in Hangzhou. A few months later, in October, the company joined a $90M Autonomous Driving Pilot Program led by Dongfeng Motor, aiming to bring more than 200 Robotaxis to Wuhan by the end of 2022. As its primary partner, DeepRoute.ai is working with Dongfeng Motor to build the largest Robotaxi fleet in Wuhan’s Central Business District and
development area, making it the most extensive fleet in China.

By January 2021, DeepRoute.ai had accumulated over one million kilometers of road testing. The company began self-driving robotaxi service in Wuhan in April 2021, and the company publicly launched robotaxi service in Shenzhen in July 2021.

In September 2021, DeepRoute.ai announced a $300 million Series B funding round led by Alibaba Group.

In December 2021, DeepRoute.ai announced DeepRoute-Driver 2.0, a production-ready Level 4 system comprising five solid-state lidar sensors, eight cameras, a proprietary computing system and an optional millimeter-wave radar. 

In February 2022, following a recent outbreak of the COVID-19 Omicron variant in Shenzhen, China, DeepRoute.ai mobilized two medium-duty trucks with level 4 autonomous driving capabilities to deliver goods and facilities into the control area, supporting local communities and medical staff. This marks the first official deployment of DeepRoute.ai’s trucks in Downtown Shenzhen.

Most recently, in June 2022, DeepRoute.ai partnered with Deppon Logistics Co., Ltd., utilizing L4 autonomous driving technology to increase carrier capacity. This marks the first commercial deployment of autonomous driving medium-duty trucks in China.

Partnerships
Since its founding, DeepRoute.ai has formed many successful partnerships. Its most recent partnership, announced in August 2022, is with the technology giant, Microsoft. DeepRoute.ai will utilize Microsoft’s cloud and edge computing platform, Microsoft Azure. The partnership aims to push forward DeepRoute.ai’s global deployment and accelerate the mass production of Level 4 autonomous vehicles while further boosting the safety of DeepRoute.ai’s self-driving systems outside of China.

DeepRoute.ai also cultivated a multi-level, in-depth partnership with one of China’s largest car manufacturers, Dongfeng Motor Corporation. This $90M project, led by Dongfeng Motor, is aiming to bring more than 200 Robotaxis to Wuhan, China by 2022. The elevated partnership with Dongfeng Motor dates back to 2019, when DeepRoute.ai first started testing Robotaxis with Dongfeng Motor in Wuhan and provided Robotaxi service during the 7th CISM Military World Games.

In June 2022, DeepRoute.ai partnered with Deppon Logistics Co., Ltd. to provide autonomous driving medium-duty trucks for logistics transfer. This marked the first use of self-driving mid-size trucks in commercial service in China.

In August 2020, DeepRoute.ai announced its partnership with Cao Cao Mobility, a Geely-backed ride-hailing company, to test Robotaxis in Hangzhou for daily operations, planning to provide hundreds of Robotaxis during the 2022 Asian Games.

References 

Self-driving car companies
Automotive technologies
Robotics